The Harvey McCoy House, at 725 Pioneer in Aztec, New Mexico, was built in 1906.  It was listed on the National Register of Historic Places in 1985.

It is built of brick laid in Flemish bond, and it has a hipped roof.

References

		
National Register of Historic Places in San Juan County, New Mexico
Houses completed in 1906
1906 establishments in New Mexico Territory